L. portoricensis may refer to:

 Laetilia portoricensis, a snout moth
 Laudetia portoricensis, an eight-eyed spider
 Leptosphaeria portoricensis, a fungus with pseudoparaphyses
 Linsleyonides portoricensis, a longhorn beetle
 Liophis portoricensis, a water snake
 Loxigilla portoricensis, a bullfinch tanager
 Lyssomanes portoricensis, a jumping spider